Woodland High School may refer to schools in the United States:

Woodland High School (California), Woodland, California
Woodland High School (Cartersville, Georgia), Cartersville, Georgia
Woodland High School (East Point, Georgia), East Point, Georgia
Woodland High School (Stockbridge, Georgia), Stockbridge, Georgia
Woodland High School (Illinois), Streator, Illinois
Woodland High School (South Carolina), Dorchester, South Carolina
Woodland High School (Washington), Woodland, Washington